Aircraft Technologies, Inc. was an American aircraft manufacturer based in Lilburn, Georgia. The company specialized in the design and manufacture of aerobatic aircraft in the form of kits for amateur construction.

The company is out of business and its products are no longer available.

The company's kits used fiberglass, carbon fiber and 4130 steel tubing construction. Both the Aircraft Technologies Atlantis and the Acro 1 were engineered for +15/-15 g.

Aircraft

References

Defunct aircraft manufacturers of the United States
Aerobatic aircraft
Homebuilt aircraft